The 2012 Tour de France was the 99th edition of the Tour de France, one of cycling's Grand Tours. It started in the Belgian city of Liège on 30 June and finished on the Champs-Élysées in Paris on 22 July. As well as the prologue, the first two stages took place in Belgium, and one stage finished in Switzerland. Bradley Wiggins won the overall general classification, and became the first British rider to win the Tour. Wiggins's teammate Chris Froome placed second, and Vincenzo Nibali was third.

The general classification leader's yellow jersey was worn for the first week by Fabian Cancellara, who won the prologue. Wiggins, second in the prologue, took the leadership of the race on stage seven, the first mountainous stage, which was won by Froome, and maintained his lead for the remainder of the race, winning the two longest time trials, and not losing time to his main challengers for the overall title in the mountains.

The points classification was won by Nibali's teammate Peter Sagan, who won three stages. 's Thomas Voeckler, winner of two mountain stages, won the mountains classification. 's Tejay van Garderen, in fifth place overall, won the young rider classification.

Teams

The 2012 edition of the Tour de France consisted of 22 teams. The race was the 18th of the 29 events in the UCI World Tour, and all of its eighteen UCI ProTeams were entitled, and obliged, to enter the race. On 6 April 2012, the organiser of the Tour, Amaury Sport Organisation (ASO), announced the four second-tier UCI Professional Continental teams given wildcard invitations, of which three were French-based (and ) and one was Dutch. The presentation of the teams – where the members of each team's roster are introduced in front of the media and local dignitaries – took place outside the Prince-Bishops' Palace in Liège, Belgium, on 28 June, two days before the opening stage held in the city.

Each squad was allowed a maximum of nine riders, resulting in a start list total of 198 riders. Of these, 35 were riding the Tour de France for the first time. The riders came from 31 countries; France, Spain, Netherlands, Italy, Belgium, Germany and Australia all had 12 or more riders in the race. Riders from six countries won stages during the race; British riders won the largest number of stages, with seven. The average age of riders in the race was 30.17 years, ranging from the 22-year-old Thibaut Pinot to the 40-year-old Jens Voigt. The  cyclists had the youngest average age while  cyclists had the oldest.

The teams entering the race were:

UCI ProTeams

 
 
 
 
 
 
 
 
 
 
 
 
 
 
 
 
 
 

UCI Professional Continental teams

Pre-race favourites

According to many observers before the race the favourite for the general classification was Bradley Wiggins. His closest rivals were thought to be Cadel Evans and Vincenzo Nibali. Alberto Contador, the winner of both the 2007 Tour and 2009 Tour, was serving a doping suspension and did not race in the 2012 Tour. Andy Schleck, who finished second in the 2010 Tour (later promoted to the winner after Contador's result was annulled in February 2012) and 2011 Tour, was not able to recover from an injury suffered in the Critérium du Dauphiné. The other riders considered contenders for the general classification were Ryder Hesjedal, Fränk Schleck, Samuel Sánchez, Jurgen Van den Broeck, Tony Martin, Denis Menchov, Levi Leipheimer, Alejandro Valverde and Robert Gesink.

Prior to the 2012 Tour, Wiggins's highest finishes in a Grand Tour were third in the 2011 Vuelta a España and fourth in the 2009 Tour (later promoted to third after Lance Armstrong's result was annulled in October 2012). Wiggins had shown his form in the lead-up to the Tour by winning the general classifications in three stage races in the 2012 season: the Paris–Nice, the Tour de Romandie and the Dauphiné. As a time trialist, Wiggins was thought to be the rider most suited to the race's course. The 2011 Tour winner Evans came back from an illness earlier in the season to win the two-day Critérium International and place third at the Dauphiné. The 2010 Vuelta a España winner Nibali had shown his form in the lead-up to the Tour by winning the Tirreno–Adriatico stage race.

The sprinters considered favourites for the points classification and wins in bunch sprint finishes were Mark Cavendish, André Greipel, Matthew Goss, Peter Sagan and Marcel Kittel. He had won the four-stage race Ster ZLM Toer thirteen days before the start of the Tour. Greipel, who had the full backing of his team, had shown his form in the season with thirteen victories up to the Tour. Goss was second to Cavendish at the world championships and was the new sprint leader of his team, although he had only one win in the year up to the Tour. Sagan was equal in wins with Greipel with thirteen, of which five came in the Tour of California and four in the Tour de Suisse. Kittel won two stages in both the Tour of Oman and Ster ZLM Toer.

Route and stages

On 29 October 2010, the ASO announced that Liège would host the 2012 edition's opening stages (known as the Grand Départ). Further details of the first three stages held in Belgium were released at an event at the city's Prince-Bishops' Palace on 18 November. Liège, which had also hosted the 2004 Grand Départ, became the first city outside France to host the Grand Départ twice. The entire route of the race was accidentally published on the ASO website on 10 October 2011, eight days before the official presentation at the Palais des Congrès in Paris. At the event, the race director, Christian Prudhomme, said, "It's a Tour designed to widen the possibilities". The route was noted as being innovative when compared to recent years, with fewer high altitude stage finishes, and more of a focus on medium mountain stages and individual time trials. Due to a clash with the start of the Olympics at the end of July, the Tour began a week earlier than usual.

After the opening prologue in Liège, stage one left the city with the finish in Seraing. The second stage took place between Visé to Tournai. The race then moved into north-west France, with the third stage ending in the coastal city of Boulogne-sur-Mer, before the fourth ended in Rouen, and the fifth in Saint-Quentin. Stage six took the race east, with the seventh ending in the Vosges Mountains. Stage eight then entered the Jura Mountains, with the finish in Porrentruy, Switzerland. A return to France saw the next stage take place between Arc-et-Senans to Besançon. The next stages, ten and eleven, went into the Alps, and stages twelve and thirteen took the Tour down to the Mediterranean coast at Cap d'Agde. Stage fourteen moved the race into the east of Pyrenees, before a transitional stage taking it to the western side of the mountains for the next two stages. Stage eighteen was held between Blagnac to Brive-la-Gaillarde in the south of the country, before a long transfer took the race back to the north-east for two further stages, with the finish on the Champs-Élysées in Paris.

Of the remaining stages, nine were officially classified as flat, four as medium mountain and five as high mountain. There were three summit finishes: stage 7, to La Planche des Belles Filles; stage 11, to La Toussuire-Les Sybelles; and stage 17, to Peyragudes. The Col du Grand Colombier, in the Alps, was included for the first time, and was among six hors catégorie (English: beyond category) rated climbs in the race. The highest point of elevation in the race was the -high Col du Tourmalet mountain pass on stage sixteen. There were nine new stage start or finish locations. The rest days were after stage nine, in Mâcon, and fifteen, in Pau.

Race overview

Opening week

The opening  prologue stage in Liège was won by 's Fabian Cancellara. Bradley Wiggins and Sylvain Chavanel placed second and third respectively, both seven seconds in arrears, with Wiggins fractionally faster. Cancellara claimed the yellow jersey as leader of the general classification and the green jersey as leader of the points classification. In stage one, a large group of riders reached the final climb, the Côte de Seraing. Cancellara attacked  from the finish, followed by Peter Sagan and Edvald Boasson Hagen, before Sagan won the three-man sprint finish at the summit. Michael Mørkøv of  took the first polka dot jersey as leader of the mountains classification. The next stage was won by Mark Cavendish from a bunch sprint finish in Tournai, Belgium, with Sagan taking the green jersey. Stage three, the first in France, saw Sagan win again, crossing the finish line with a comfortable margin on the short steep climb in Boulogne-sur-Mer. The fourth stage ended with a bunch sprint which was won by André Greipel. A crash with  remaining took Cavendish out of contention for the stage win. Another bunch finish occurred on the next stage, with Greipel victorious again. The sixth stage was won by Sagan in another bunch sprint.

Vosges, Jura and Alps
In stage seven, the first at altitude, the last of the day's breakaway riders were caught with  remaining, on the final climb to La Planche des Belles Filles. A select group of five – Wiggins and his compatriot and teammate Chris Froome, Cadel Evans, Vincenzo Nibali and Rein Taaramäe – then pulled clear in the final kilometre. Evans attacked before Froome countered and went on to win the stage and take the polka dot jersey. Cancellara lost almost two minutes on the day and surrendered the yellow jersey to Wiggins, who became the fifth British rider to wear the jersey. The eighth stage saw breakaway rider Thibaut Pinot attack a reduced break on the final climb, the Col de la Croix, and solo to the finish in Porrentruy, Switzerland, taking the victory by margin of 26 seconds. Breakaway rider Fredrik Kessiakoff took the polka dot jersey. Stage nine's  individual time trial was won by Wiggins, with Froome 35 seconds down in second and Cancellara a further 22 seconds behind in third. Froome moved up to third overall. The next day was the first rest day of the Tour.

The tenth stage was the first classified as mountainous. The Col du Grand Colombier broke apart a 25-rider breakaway, leaving a small group to contest the finish at Bellegarde-sur-Valserine; Thomas Voeckler claimed the stage win and the polka dot jersey. Another mountain stage followed the next day, which again saw a large breakaway. The break crossed the two hors catégorie climbs – the Col de la Madeleine and the Col de la Croix de Fer – before being caught by the chasing group, which contained the overall contenders. The group of overall contenders followed 55 seconds later. Evans was not in the leading contenders group and, due to the time lost, he dropped from second to fourth overall, over three minutes in arrears. Kessiakoff took back the lead of the mountains classification. In stage twelve, a large breakaway formed  in, before later reducing to five riders across the Col du Granier. They stayed together until the finish, where, with a kilometer remaining, David Millar escaped to take victory, closely followed by Jean-Christophe Péraud. The next stage finished with a bunch sprint won by Greipel, with Sagan second.

Pyrenees
In the first stage in the Pyrenees, the fourteenth stage overall, a large breakaway escaped  in, and at one point amassed a lead of fifteen minutes. Of the five remaining riders from the final climb of Mur de Péguère, Luis León Sánchez of  attacked on an ascent with  remaining and soloed to the finish in Foix. As the peloton (the main group) passed the Mur de Péguère, a large number of riders suffered tyre punctures; it was later discovered that the race course had been sabotaged with carpet tacks. Evans waited over a minute to get a replacement wheel, then had a further two punctures on the descent. As an act of sportsmanship Wiggins then forced the peloton to wait for Evans to return to the group. The next stage ran through the foothills of the Pyrenees. The following day was the Tour's second rest day.

In the sixteenth stage, the race entered the high mountains with the queen stage crossing two hors catégorie climbs – the Col d'Aubisque and the Col du Tourmalet – followed by the first-category climbs of the Col d'Aspin and the Col de Peyresourde, completing the so-called "Circle of Death". A 38-rider breakaway crossed the Aubisque, before fracturing on the Tourmalet. Voeckler attacked on the Peyresourde and took the stage win with a margin of one minute and forty seconds. Voeckler's stage victory and maximum points over all summits put him in the lead of the mountains classification. Wiggins, Froome and Nibali came in seven minutes after Voeckler, while Evans lost almost five minutes to the trio, falling from fourth to seventh in the general classification. In the final stage in the Pyrenees, the seventeenth, after a number of attacks on the leading group containing the overall contenders, Alejandro Valverde moved clear over the hors categorie Port de Balès. He held his lead to the summit finish at the Peyragudes ski resort. In the group behind, Wiggins and Froome attacked their rivals to finish nineteen seconds later. Nibali came in seventh, a further eighteen seconds down. In the following stage, six riders from a breakaway were caught on the finishing straight in Brive-la-Gaillarde by the head of the chasing peloton, with Cavendish taking the victory ahead of Matthew Goss and Sagan respectively.

Finale
Wiggins secured the general classification in the penultimate stage's  individual time trial. Froome placed second, one minute and sixteen seconds in arrears, with Sánchez a further 34 seconds behind in third. In the final stage, Cavendish won his fourth consecutive Champs-Élysées stage, to record his third stage win of the race. Wiggins finished the race to become the first British rider to win the Tour de France. Wiggins finished 3 min 21 s clear of compatriot and teammate Froome. Nibali placed third at 6 min 19 s behind Wiggins. Sagan won the points classification with a total of 421, 141 ahead of Greipel in second. Voeckler won the mountains classification with 135 points, 12 ahead of second-placed Kessiakoff. The best young rider was  rider Tejay van Garderen, who was followed by Pinot and Steven Kruijswijk in second and third respectively.  finished as the winners of the team classification, over 5 min 46 s ahead of second-placed . Of the 198 starters, 153 reached the finish of the last stage in Paris.

Doping
During the race's first rest day, the team hotel of the  squad, in Bourg-en-Bresse, was searched by French police and gendarmerie. One of the team's riders in the Tour, Rémy Di Gregorio, was arrested in relation to an ongoing anti-doping case, and was immediately suspended by the French team, although the case had been open since 2011, when Di Gregorio was a member of the  team. The second rest day was marked by a positive drugs test by Fränk Schleck, the third-placed rider from the 2011 Tour. Schleck was withdrawn from the race by his team after traces of xipamide, a banned sulfonamide diuretic drug, were found in the A-sample of his urine; the presence of xipamide was later confirmed by the B-sample. Subsequently, in January 2013, he was given a one-year ban by the Luxembourg Anti-Doping Agency. In July 2014, Denis Menchov was retroactively disqualified from the race by cycling's governing body, Union Cycliste Internationale, for "abnormalities in his biological passport".

Classification leadership and minor prizes
There were four main individual classifications contested in the 2012 Tour de France, as well as a team competition. The most important was the general classification, which was calculated by adding each rider's finishing times on each stage. There were no time bonuses given at the end of stages for this edition of the Tour. If a crash had happened within the final  of a stage, not including time trials and summit finishes, the riders involved would have received the same time as the group they were in when the crash occurred. The rider with the lowest cumulative time was the winner of the general classification and was considered the overall winner of the Tour. The rider leading the classification wore a yellow jersey.

The second classification was the points classification. Riders received points for finishing in the top fifteen positions in a stage finish, or in intermediate sprints during the stage. The points available for each stage finish were determined by the stage's type. The flat stage finishes awarded a maximum of 45 points, the medium mountain stages awarded a maximum of 30 points, and the high mountain stages, time trials and intermediate sprints awarded a maximum of 20 points. The leader was identified by a green jersey.

The third classification was the mountains classification. Most stages of the race included one or more categorised climbs, in which points were awarded to the riders that reached the summit first. The climbs were categorised as fourth-, third-, second- or first-category and hors catégorie, with the more difficult climbs rated lower. Fourth-category awarded 1 rider with 1 point; third-category awarded 2 riders, the first with 2 points; second-category awarded 4 riders, the first with 5 points; and first-category awarded 6 riders, the first with 10 points; and hors catégorie awarded ten riders, the first with 25 points. Double points were awarded on the summit finishes on stages 1, 11 and 20. The leader wore a white jersey with red polka dots.

The final individual classification was the young rider classification. This was calculated the same way as the general classification, but the classification was restricted to riders who were born on or after 1 January 1987. The leader wore a white jersey.

The final classification was a team classification. This was calculated using the finishing times of the best three riders per team on each stage; the leading team was the team with the lowest cumulative time. The number of stage victories and placings per team determined the outcome of a tie. The riders in the team that lead this classification were identified with yellow number bibs on the back of their jerseys and, for first the time in the Tour's history, wore yellow helmets.

In addition, there was a combativity award given after each stage to the rider considered, by a jury, to have "made the greatest effort and who has demonstrated the best qualities of sportsmanship". No combativity awards were given for the prologue, the time trials and the final stage. The winner wore a red number bib the following stage. At the conclusion of the Tour, Chris Anker Sørensen won the overall super-combativity award, again, decided by a jury.

A total of €2,414,246 was awarded in cash prizes in the race. The overall winner of the general classification received €450,000, with the second and third placed riders getting €200,000 and €100,000 respectively. All finishers of the race were awarded money. The holders of the classifications benefited on each stage they led; the final winners of the points and mountains classifications were given €25,000, while the best young rider and most combative rider got €20,000. The team classification winners were given €50,000. There were also two special awards each with a prize of €5,000, the Souvenir Henri Desgrange, given to the first rider to pass the summit of the Col de la Croix de Fer in stage eleven, and the Souvenir Jacques Goddet, given to the first rider to pass Goddet's memorial at the summit of the Col du Tourmalet in stage sixteen. Pierre Rolland won the Henri Desgrange and Thomas Voeckler won the Jacques Goddet.

 In stage one, Bradley Wiggins, who was second in the points classification, wore the green jersey, because first placed Fabian Cancellara wore the yellow jersey as leader of the general classification.
 In stage two, Peter Sagan, who was second in the points classifications, wore the green jersey, because Fabian Cancellara wore the yellow jersey as leader of the general classification during that stage.

Final standings

General classification

Points classification

Mountains classification

Young rider classification

Team classification

UCI World Tour rankings

Riders from the ProTeams competing individually, as well as for their teams and nations, for points that contributed towards the World Tour rankings. Points were awarded to the top twenty finishers in the general classification and to the top five finishers in each stage. Wiggins moved into the lead of the individual ranking, with Joaquim Rodríguez dropping to second. The points accrued by Chris Froome moved him from 52nd to 6th.  retained their lead in the team ranking, ahead of second-place . Spain remained as the leaders of the nation ranking, with Italy second.

See also

 2012 in men's road cycling
 2012 in sports

Notes

References

Bibliography

Further reading

External links

 

 
2012 in Belgian sport
2012 in French sport
2012 UCI World Tour
June 2012 sports events in Europe
July 2012 sports events in Europe
2012 Tour de France
2012